Yang Jun (born 28 April 1988 in Beijing) is a female Chinese water polo goalkeeper who was part of the silver medal-winning team at the 2011 World Championships, held in Shanghai, and 2007 World Junior Championship. She competed at the 2008, 2012 and 2016 Summer Olympics. She is a leading goalkeeper in Olympic water polo history, with 138 saves.

See also
 China women's Olympic water polo team records and statistics
 List of players who have appeared in multiple women's Olympic water polo tournaments
 List of women's Olympic water polo tournament goalkeepers
 List of World Aquatics Championships medalists in water polo

References

External links
 

1988 births
Living people
Sportspeople from Beijing
Chinese female water polo players
Water polo goalkeepers
Olympic water polo players of China
Water polo players at the 2008 Summer Olympics
Water polo players at the 2012 Summer Olympics
Water polo players at the 2016 Summer Olympics
World Aquatics Championships medalists in water polo
Asian Games medalists in water polo
Water polo players at the 2010 Asian Games
Water polo players at the 2014 Asian Games
Asian Games gold medalists for China
Medalists at the 2010 Asian Games
Medalists at the 2014 Asian Games
Universiade medalists in water polo
Universiade gold medalists for China
Medalists at the 2009 Summer Universiade
Medalists at the 2011 Summer Universiade
21st-century Chinese women